The French ironclad Couronne ("Crown") was the first iron-hulled ironclad warship built for the French Navy in 1859–1862. She was the first such ship to be laid down, although the British armoured frigate  was completed first. The ship participated in the Franco-Prussian War of 1870–1871, but saw no combat. She was served as a gunnery training ship from 1885 to 1908 before she was hulked the following year and became a barracks ship in Toulon. Couronne was scrapped in 1934, over 70 years after she was completed.

Design and description

Designed by the French naval architect Camille Audenet as an iron-hulled armoured frigate of similar type to the s, although strictly not a sister ship but a unique vessel, Couronne was also intended to fight in the line of battle, unlike the first British ironclads. The ship was classified as an armoured frigate because she only had a single gun deck and her traditional disposition of guns arrayed along the length of the hull also meant that she was a broadside ironclad. The ship's metacentric height of  meant that she rolled less and was a better sea boat than the Gloires. Her gun ports were slightly higher above the waterline than those of her predecessors, and Couronne took aboard less water as well. She had a crew of 570 officers and enlisted men.

The details of Couronnes sailing rig are not precisely known, although a photograph of her in her original single-decker ironclad guise quite clearly shows her with full ship rig (square rig on three masts), but presumably she was fitted with a light barquentine rig with three masts like that of the Gloire-class ships. It is also unknown if she had the same multiple changes of rigging as those ships.

Couronne was armed with 36 Modèle 1860  rifled breech-loading guns, 30 of which were positioned on the single gun deck in the broadside. The remaining 4 guns were placed on the upper deck as chase guns. They fired a  shell at a muzzle velocity of only  and proved to be ineffective against armour. The ship was rearmed multiple times during her career, the first of which was the replacement of the chase guns by four  howitzers in 1864 and the replacement of the rest of the guns by improved Modèle 1864 guns. The ship was subsequently rearmed with 16 Modèle 1864 or 1866  guns on her main deck and six 164.7-millimetre guns on the upper deck as chase guns. Her final armament configuration before she became a gunnery training ship in 1881 was eight  Modèle 1870 guns and four 194-millimetre Modèle 1870 guns on the main deck. A pair of  guns and a dozen  5-barrelled Hotchkiss revolving cannon were mounted on the upper deck.

Couronnes wrought iron hull was completely protected by armour plates 120 millimetres thick.

Construction and service 

Ordered on 4 March 1858, Couronne was laid down at the Arsenal de Lorient on 14 February 1859, launched on 28 March 1861 and commissioned on 2 February 1862 at a cost of 6,018,885 francs. While assigned to the Mediterranean Fleet, the ship made a port visit in August 1865 to Brest where the fleet hosted the British Channel Fleet. A few days later the French fleet made a reciprocal visit to Portsmouth where it was hosted by the Channel Fleet. On 1 March 1867, Couronne was driven ashore in the Îles d'Hyères, Var in a storm. Several people died.

During the Franco-Prussian War the ship was assigned to Vice Admiral Léon Martin Fourichon's squadron that blockaded German ports in the Heligoland Bight in August and September 1870. The four German ironclads at Wilhelmshaven sortied in search of the French squadron in early August before the French arrived and in mid-September after the French were forced to abandon the blockade for lack of coal.

Couronne returned to Toulon on 10 December. In 1876, she was assigned to the Mediterranean Squadron. From 1881 to 1885, Couronne was reconstructed to serve as a gunnery training ship, replacing Souverain: her armour was replaced by wood of the same thickness, two boilers were removed and her propeller was replaced. Her rigging was replaced by a full ship rig and iron spar deck and poop decks were fitted which gave her the appearance of a steam ship of the line of the  type. The ship was rearmed with an assortment of guns of various calibres for training purposes, replacing Souverain in this role. Her crew and trainees numbered 1200 officers and enlisted men. Couronne was replaced as a gunnery training ship on 1 December 1908 and disarmed on 1 September 1909. She was subsequently converted to a floating barracks at Toulon until she was scrapped in 1934.

Footnotes

Bibliography

 

 

 

Ships built in France
1861 ships
Ironclad warships of the French Navy
CSS Alabama
Maritime incidents in March 1867